Scunthorpe railway station serves the town of Scunthorpe in North Lincolnshire, England. The station is located a short walk from the town centre, on Station Road.

As one approaches the station by road, there is a pay and display car park with around 50 spaces, including 2 disabled spaces. From the car park, it is a short walk to the Ticket Office. Close to the entrance, there is a public telephone box.

The station has two platforms. Platform 1 serves mainly eastbound trains toward Grimsby/Cleethorpes, although some Northern Trains "stopper" services toward Doncaster do use this platform through the day. All westbound TransPennine Express (TPE) services, and most Northern services use Platform 2. This platform is accessible via a footbridge over the tracks and is not accessible for wheelchairs or mobility-impaired passengers. Lifts will however, become available at this station in spring 2019.

The station has limited seating on both platforms and three waiting rooms. There are toilets available on Platform 1, although their use was at one time accessible only by requesting a key from the ticket office; they are now open at all times. When access was restricted, the toilets were kept very clean, earning them the title of "Loo of the Year" in 2005, under the "Railway Stations" category.

This is not the original Scunthorpe station. The original station was known as Frodingham and located over half a mile to the east near the Brigg Road bridge (then a level crossing). It opened in 1864, it was replaced by a second station just 200 yd west from the first in 1887. This one was closed when the present station was opened on 11 March 1928. For over 40 years, the original station was known as "Scunthorpe & Frodingham".

From 1906, the town had another station serving the North Lindsey Light Railway, a line which ran from Dawes Lane, about half a mile to the east, to (originally) West Halton.

Layout

Services
Services at Scunthorpe are operated by Northern Trains and TransPennine Express.

The typical off-peak service in trains per hour is:

 1 tph to  via  (semi-fast)

On Sundays, the stopping service to Doncaster does not operate. There is a two-hourly service between Cleethorpes and Manchester Piccadilly in the morning which improves to hourly in the afternoon.

A programme of major engineering work on the route between Thorne Junction and Scunthorpe in the summer of 2009 closed the line for 10 weeks to allow embankment reconstruction work to take place.

In February 2013 the line northeast of Hatfield and Stainforth station towards Thorne was blocked by the Hatfield Colliery landslip, with all services over the section halted. The line reopened in July 2013. During the closure a modified timetable was in operation with Cleethorpes trains starting/terminating here.

References

External links 

Buildings and structures in Scunthorpe
Railway stations in the Borough of North Lincolnshire
DfT Category D stations
Former London and North Eastern Railway stations
Railway stations in Great Britain opened in 1928
Railway stations served by TransPennine Express
Northern franchise railway stations